Bouna Tehini Airport  is an airport serving Bouna, Côte d'Ivoire.

See also
Transport in Côte d'Ivoire

References

 OurAirports - Bouna
  Great Circle Mapper - Bouna
 Google Earth

Airports in Ivory Coast
Buildings and structures in Zanzan District
Bounkani